The 1979 Washington Star International was a men's tennis tournament and was played on outdoor clay courts. The event was part of the 1979 Grand Prix circuit. It was the 11th edition of the tournament and was held at Rock Creek Park in Washington, D.C. from July 16 through July 22, 1979. First-seeded Guillermo Vilas won the singles title, his third at the event after 1975 and 1977.

Finals

Singles
 Guillermo Vilas defeated  Víctor Pecci, Sr. 7–6(7–4), 7–6(7–3)
 It was Vilas' 2nd singles title of the year and the 44th of his career.

Doubles
 Marty Riessen /  Sherwood Stewart defeated  Brian Gottfried /  Raúl Ramírez 2–6, 6–3, 6–4

References

External links
 ATP tournament profile
 ITF tournament edition details

Washington Open (tennis)
Washington Star International
Washington Star International
Washington Star International